"Zebra Dun" is a traditional American cowboy song dating from at least 1890. Jack Thorp said he collected it from Randolph Reynolds at Carrizzozo Flats in that year. The song tells of a stranger who happened into a cowboy camp at the head of the Cimarron River. When he asks to borrow a "fat saddle horse", the cowboys fix him up:

Thorp published the song under the title "Educated Feller" in 1908.  Two years later, John Lomax published a substantially longer version as "Zebra Dun" in Cowboy Songs and Other Frontier Ballads.

"Zebra Dun" was one of the most popular songs among the cowboys and is included in many song books. The singing cowboy, Jules Verne Allen, was the first to record it (Victor V-40022, 1928).

References

Bibliography 
 Lomax, John A., M.A. Cowboy Songs and Other Frontier Ballads. The MacMillan Company, 1918. Online edition (pdf)
Russell, Tony. Country Music Records: A Discography, 1921-1942. Oxford University Press, 2004. 
 Thorp, N. Howard "Jack". Songs of the Cowboys. Houghton Mifflin Company, 1908, 1921.

Western music (North America)
American folk songs
Year of song unknown
Songwriter unknown